Leslie Wood (26 February 1920 – 1994) was an English artist and illustrator who lived in Poynton, Cheshire.

Born in Stockport, he studied at the Manchester College of Art and Design and gained a travelling scholarship. Prevented from travelling abroad because of World War II, he instead went to London. In 1943, Wood showed some of his work to Faber and Faber, and was soon commissioned to take over illustration of Diana Ross' Little Red Engine books, and went on to illustrate many other children's books including the covers of the first fourteen Hugh Walters Chris Godrey of UNEXA series.

He also produced cover illustrations for The Countryman magazine.

References

External links

 Leslie Wood page on the Diana Ross website
 Leslie Wood page on The Culture Archive
 Leslie Wood website

1920 births
1994 deaths
English illustrators
British children's book illustrators
People from Poynton
People from Stockport
Alumni of Manchester Metropolitan University